Ippolit Antonovich Monighetti (1819–1878) was a Russian architect of Swiss descent
 who worked for the Romanov family. Member and professor by rank of the Imperial Academy of Arts.

Biography
Monighetti attended the Stroganov Art School and then studied at the Imperial Academy of Arts under Alexander Brullov, matriculating in 1839 with a gold medal. His extensive journeys in Egypt and Italy in the 1840s predetermined his interest in revivalist architecture.

Monighetti started his career as a fashionable architect by designing a cluster of villas in Tsarskoe Selo, notable those for Princess Yusupov and Prince Bagration. In 1850, he was commissioned by Nicholas I of Russia to stylise a Turkish bath in the Catherine Park as a little mosque. In the 1860s, Monighetti was responsible for refurbishing several rooms of the Catherine Palace.

On the strength of his success in Tsarskoe Selo, Monighetti was asked by Alexander II to design his summer residence in Livadiya, Crimea. Of his Crimean structures, only the neo-Byzantine church of the Livadia Palace still stands. He also refurbished the imperial yachts Livadia and Derzhava.

In the 1870s, Monighetti designed new interiors for the Skierniewice Palace (near Warsaw), Anichkov Palace and the Yusupov Palace (both in Saint Petersburg). At the end of his life, Monighetti became interested in the Russian Revival. He applied the newly fashionable style to the Polytechnical Museum in Moscow, the Russian church in Vevey, Switzerland, and the sepulchre for Alexander II's illegitimate children in Tsarskoe Selo.

Works

References 

Russian people of Swiss descent
1819 births
1878 deaths
19th-century architects from the Russian Empire
Stroganov Moscow State Academy of Arts and Industry alumni